Minuscule 245 (in the Gregory-Aland numbering), ε 1226 (Soden), is a Greek minuscule manuscript of the New Testament, on parchment. It is dated by a colophon to the year 1199. It has marginalia.

Description 

The codex contains a complete text of the four Gospels on 255 parchment leaves (size ). The text is written in one column per page, 21-23 lines per page. The leaves were arranged in quarto.

The text is divided according to the Ammonian Sections whose numbers are given at the margin.

Synaxarion and Menologion were added by a later hand.

Text 

The Greek text of the codex is a representative of the Byzantine text-type. Aland placed it in Category V.

Hermann von Soden lists it as Is (along with codices 157, 235,  291, 713, 1012).

According to the Claremont Profile Method it has mixture of the Byzantine text-families in Luke 1. In Luke 10 and Luke 20 it represents textual cluster 1167.

History 

The manuscript was written by John, a priest, in 1199.
Formerly the manuscript was held at the monastery Vatopedi at Athos peninsula. It was brought to Moscow, in 1655, by the monk Arsenius, on the suggestion of the Patriarch Nikon, in the reign of Alexei Mikhailovich Romanov (1645-1676). The manuscript was collated by C. F. Matthaei.

The manuscript is currently housed at the State Historical Museum (V. 16, S. 278) at Moscow.

See also 

 List of New Testament minuscules
 Biblical manuscript
 Textual criticism

References

Further reading 

 C. F. Matthaei, Novum Testamentum Graece et Latine, (Riga, 1782-1788). (as o)

External links 

 Minuscule 245 at the Encyclopedia of Textual Criticism

Greek New Testament minuscules
12th-century biblical manuscripts